Light My Fire is the second studio album by Spanish duo Baccara, first released on label RCA-Victor in Germany in August 1978. It contains the European hit singles "Darling" and "Parlez-Vous Français?", their entry for the 1978 Eurovision Song Contest. Baccara represented Luxembourg, performed their song in French and although they undoubtedly were the biggest stars participating in that year's contest they surprisingly only finished in 7th place.

The rights to the RCA-Victor back catalogue are currently held by Sony BMG Music Entertainment - the original Light My Fire album in its entirety remains unreleased on compact disc.

Track listing

Side A
 "Baby, Why Don't You Reach Out?" / "Light My Fire" (Peter Zentner, Rolf Soja) / (Jim Morrison, John Densmore, Ray Manzarek, Robby Krieger) (Full-length version) - 11:48
 "Parlez-vous français?" (French version) (Frank Dostal, Soja, Zentner) - 4:26

Side B
 "La Bamba" (Traditional; arranged by María Mendiola and Rolf Soja) - 3:00
 "My Kisses Need a Cavalier" (Dostal, Soja) - 4:53
 "Adelita" (Traditional; arranged by María Mendiola and Rolf Soja) - 2:27
 "Yummy Yummy Yummy" (Joey Levine, Arthur Resnick) - 3:34
 "Darling" (Full-length version) (Dostal, Soja) - 5:51

Alternative album editions

Same artwork as per German release back cover a new B/W Photo added to the cover & track listing has changed.

UK Edition, RCA PL 28342, 1979

Side A
 "The Devil Sent You to Lorado" (Dostal - Soja) - 4:07
 "Baby, Why Don't You Reach Out?" / "Light My Fire" (Zentner - Soja) / (Morrison, Densmore, Manzarek, Krieger) (Edited version) - 4:44
 "Somewhere in Paradise" (Soja - Zentner) - 4:12
 "Parlez-vous français?" (English version) (Dostal - Soja - Zentner) - 4:26

Side B
 "La Bamba" (Traditional) - 3:00
 "My Kisses Need a Cavalier" (Dostal - Soja) - 4:53
 "Adelita" (Traditional) - 2:27
 "Yummy Yummy Yummy" (Levine - Resnick) - 3:34
 "Darling" (Full-length version) (Dostal - Soja) - 5:51

Personnel
 Mayte Mateos - vocals
 María Mendiola - vocals

Production
 Produced and arranged by Rolf Soja.
 "La Bamba" and "Adelita" arranged by Mayte Mateos, María Mendiola & Rolf Soja.

Charts

Certifications

References

1978 albums
Baccara albums